Tasif Khan is a British-born Pakistani super flyweight professional boxer.

He has won a number of championship belts, including the Superflyweight World Champion. (World Boxing Union), Superflyweight World Champion, (Global Boxing Union), Bantamweight World Champion (World Boxing Confederation) and the International Masters Champion.

Outside of boxing, Khan is an Ambassador for the Kashmir Orphans Relief Trust (KORT), a registered UK charity. KORT works in Pakistan to aid orphans and children in need.

Early life 
Born in Bradford, Khan started boxing at the age of 10. But Khan pursued a path of teaching in a primary school as a day job at Atlas Community Primary School where he taught PE. He is also a champion boxing fighter who just won the African Tittle.

Boxing career 

Prior to turning professional, he became the North of England Champion in 2004, the National England finalist in 2005, and held the Yorkshire and Humber Champion title for six years. Turning professional, Khan rose also fought on the undercard of the Amir Khan v Paul Mckloskey boxing bout in Manchester MEN arena.

Khan has won the Superflyweight World Champion (World Boxing Union), Superflyweight World Champion (Global Boxing Union), Bantamweight World Champion (World Boxing Confederation) and the International Masters Champion

Tasif Khan is promoted by Monarch Promotions.

Charity and community work 
Khan is an Ambassador for the Kashmir Orphans Relief Trust (KORT), a registered UK charity (Charity No. 1113836), and has been deployed to Pakistan to oversee projects and visit beneficiaries. Khan also ran the Kirklees 10K Challenge on 11 May 2019 and the Tatton 10K Challenge on 12 May 2019 while fasting during the month of Ramadan to raise funds for KORT

Khan has also been named a Community Champion in Bradford, a scheme which sees local people from different walks of life visit schools and talk to pupils about how they have made a success of their lives. Khan was among other champions who visited Carlton Bolling School in 2018 to give an assembly to Year 11 pupils

He has made a number of appearances, including the launch of a new £1.5m easyGym opening in Bradford city centre in 2017 and a literacy campaign launched by Bradford Council and National Literacy Trust in 2014.

References 

Year of birth missing (living people)
Pakistani male boxers
Super-flyweight boxers
Living people